Jan Marcus Lindberg (born 31 August 1980) is a Swedish former professional footballer. He won three caps for the Sweden national team between 2001 and 2009.

Coaching career
After retiring, it was announced in October 2012, that Lindberg would become playing manager of Swedish fourth division club Åstorps FF from 2013.

References

External links
 

1980 births
Living people
People from Svalöv Municipality
Swedish footballers
Sweden international footballers
Superettan players
Allsvenskan players
Kalmar FF players
Helsingborgs IF players
Mjällby AIF players
Ängelholms FF players
Association football defenders
Footballers from Skåne County